Calmodulin-like protein 3 is a protein that in humans is encoded by the CALML3 gene.

References

External links

Further reading

EF-hand-containing proteins